FTSJ may refer to:

 23S rRNA (uridine2552-2'-O)-methyltransferase, an enzyme
 FTSJ1, an enzyme
 FTSJ3, an enzyme